Thomas Tipping Aveling (6 July 1771 – 22 September 1820) was an Anglican priest in the late 18th and early 19th centuries. 

Aveling was born in West Bengal and educated at Corpus Christi College, Cambridge. He held incumbencies at Aspley Guise and Husborne Crawley. He was Archdeacon of Derry from 1813 until his death.

References

1820 deaths
1771 births
Archdeacons of Derry
Alumni of Corpus Christi College, Cambridge
People from West Bengal
18th-century English Anglican priests
19th-century Irish Anglican priests